Roger J. Sippl (born February 22, 1955), an American entrepreneur in the computer software industry, was described in 2012 by The Wall Street Journal as a serial entrepreneur. Sippl was the founder and CEO of Informix Corporation, later becoming IBM Informix. Other sippl accomplishments included being co-founder and chairman of Vantive, and the CEO and founder of Visigenic: three companies he took public. Currently, he is the CEO of Elastic Intelligence located in Menlo Park, California.

Early life and education
Roger J. Sippl, the sixth of seven children, grew up in Wausau, Wisconsin. His father Charles J. Sippl Jr. (1924-1991) wrote the first computer dictionary in 1963. Sippl attended Corona del Mar High School in Corona Del Mar, California. For college, he attended UC Irvine where he was pre med for two years, and then transferred to UC Berkeley. There, he studied Biochemistry, Immunology and Computer Science.

Career
Sippl is the founder of Informix, Vantive, Visigenic, and Elastic Intelligence.

While still a student at UC Berkeley, he obtained a full-time position as a programmer for Bechtel. Moving on to Cromemco, he landed a job as a programmer working for Harry Garland and Roger Melen. He asked permission to leave Cromemco to start his own software company, Relational Database Systems, Inc., in 1980 and Melen licensed Sippl’s designs to him as long as Cromemco received the first OEM on the product.

Needing more money, Sippl sold 10% of Relational Database Systems, Inc. to his then future wife for $20,000. He received $184,600 of VC Angel funding. Attending a Spring Joint Computer Conference in Atlantic City, he joined a computer manufacturer’s tent where he helped to promote their product by using his new system on their hardware. He sold a copy for $5000. The name Relational Database Systems, Inc. was changed to Informix.
 
Informix pioneered SQL relational databases, 4GL application development tools, and OLTP database technology. In 1986, Sippl brought Informix public, with $20 million revenue per year. Informix is now a part of IBM after peaking at a $4,000,000,000 market cap. He was CEO for ten years.

He was the cofounder and chairman of the Vantive Corporation. Vantive was a leader in CRM. When brought public, it was acquired by PeopleSoft/Oracle. Vantive peaked at a $1,000,000,000 market cap.

He also founded Visigenic in 1993, the first application server with the notion of sharing business logic. It was the beginning of three tier architecture and helped pioneer distributed object computing and the concept of the application server based on CORBA. In 1997, Borland acquired Visigenic. After bringing Visigenic public in 1998, Sippl was noteworthy for successfully bringing three Silicon Valley companies public.
 
He founded Elastic Intelligence in 1996, to improve connection to SaaS-based data. The company's main product is the Connection Cloud, an SQL-based Platform as a Service for SaaS data.

Investing
Sippl is a founding partner in Sippl MacDonald Ventures. He has invested in such companies as Illustra, Broadvision, SupportSoft and Red Pepper. He has been on over twelve boards of for-profit corporations, public and private. The public companies include Informix, Vantive, SupportSoft, and Interwoven, as well as having represented the software industry on the X/OPEN Board of Directors.

Personal life
Sippl and his wife, Liz, have raised three children, and enjoy an active, outdoorsy life. He also writes poetry.

References

External links
 http://investing.businessweek.com/research/stocks/private/person.asp?personId=138837&privcapId=116534182&previousCapId=12665683&previousTitle=WaveMaker%20Software,%20Inc
 http://www.connectioncloud.com/how-it-helps/index.php
 http://sipplinvestments.com/team.html
 Roger Sippl, oral history (ComputerHistory.org)

Living people
1955 births
American technology chief executives
American computer businesspeople
Silicon Valley people
People from Wausau, Wisconsin